The Micropalaeontological Society (TMS) is a scientific society based in the UK with international membership. It was founded in 1970 for the promotion of the study of micropalaeontology, the study of microscopic fossils.

TMS is established as a UK registered charity, number 284013, with the objective "to advance the education of the public in the study of Micropalaeontology" and is operated exclusively for scientific and educational purposes. It publishes a journal, special publications and newsletter, organises meetings and makes various awards and grants.

The society is organised into six specialist groups, namely Foraminifera, Microvertebrates, Calcareous Nannofossils, Ostracods, Palynology and Silicofossils. The groups hold separate meetings, including field trips, throughout the year; these were traditionally meetings for UK-based members but have become more international in their scope. For example, the TMS joint Foraminifera and Nannofossil Spring Meeting have taken place in Denmark, France, Germany, Poland, Switzerland, and The Netherlands. The Society holds an annual conference during November each year.

History 
The Micropalaeontological Society was founded in 1970 as the British Micropalaeontological Group (BMG) with the stated aim of furthering the study of micropalaeontology. The primary founder of the BMG was Professor Leslie Rowsell Moore (1912–2003) of the University of Sheffield. The principal aims of the BMG were to host scientific meetings and to organise multidisciplinary micropalaeontological research on British type sections from all systems, and publish the results. The inaugural committee and technical meetings of the BMG were held in Imperial College London in 1971. The Group was organised by a main committee and had five specialist groups. The latter were the conodont, foraminifera, ostracods, pollen, spores, and non-calcareous microplankton (i.e. palynology), and other special micropalaeontological interests.

In 1975, the BMG became the British Micropalaeontological Society (BMS) and it produced its first publication, a newsletter The British Micropalaeontologist. In 2001 the Society changed its name to The Micropalaeontological Society (TMS), to reflect the increasing international profile and membership. There are currently (2014) six specialist groups, namely Calcareous Nannofossil, Foraminifera, Microvertebrate, Ostracod, Palynology and Silicofossil. Members of TMS may elect to be part of one or more of these groups. Specialist group and general meetings are held throughout the year and the Annual General Meeting is traditionally held each November.

The society is one of the three main UK-based palaeontological societies and collaborates with the Palaeontological Association the Palaeontographical Society and the Geological Society of London via the Joint Committee for Palaeontology.

Publications 
The society produces the Newsletter of Micropalaeontology twice a year. In 1982 the association initiated its serial journal, the Journal of Micropalaeontology. Between 1982 and 1983, one issue per year was produced; this was increased to two parts per annum in 1984. The journal i now fully open access, and is currently published by Copernicus Publication. Prior to this the society published occasional publications such as stratigraphical atlases of individual microfossil groups and conference proceedings and the Stereo Atlas of Ostracod Shells (published 1973–1998). In 2003 the society changed the publication model from essentially self-publishing to using the Geological Society Publishing House (GSPH) for all matters associated with production and distribution. The GSPH now produces all the society Special Publications. To date, there have been 6 Micropalaeontology Special Publications produced with the GSPH:
 TMS006 - Landmarks in Foraminiferal Micropalaeontology: History and Development. Edited by A.J. Bowden, F.J. Gregory and A.S. Henderson.
 TMS005 - Biological and Geological Perspectives of Dinoflagellates. Edited by F. Marret, J.M. Lewis & L.R. Bradley.
 TMS004 - Micropalaeontology, Sedimentary Environments and Stratigraphy: A Tribute to Dennis Curry (1912-2001). Edited by J. E. Whittaker and M. B. Hart.
 TMS003 - Ostracods in British Stratigraphy. Edited by J. E. Whittaker and M. B. Hart.
 TMS002 - Deep-Time Perspectives on Climate Change: Marrying the Signal from Computer Models and Biological Proxies. Edited by M Williams, A M Haywood, J Gregory & D N Schmidt.
 TMS001 - Recent Developments in Applied Biostratigraphy. Edited by A. J. Powell & J. B. Riding.

The Micropalaeontological Society executive committee 
The main committee comprises a President, Secretary and Treasurer, who each have a three-year term of office. The main committee also includes the editors of the Journal, Special Publications and Newsletter, as well as the Membership Secretary, Webmaster, Publicity Officer, Industrial Liaison Officer and Archivist. They are elected for a three-year term of office and are eligible to stand for a second term. At each main committee meeting a representative of each specialist group (currently Calcareous Nannofossil, Foraminifera, Microvertebrate, Ostracod, Palynology and Silicofossil) should be present. Group Representative positions are normally held for two years.

TMS Presidents 
 J. Pike (2019–present)
 J. Riding (2016-2019)
 F. J. Gregory (2013–2016)
 M. P. Smith (2010-2013)
 M. K. Kucera (2007-2010)
 D. J. Siveter (2004-2007)
 H. W. Bailey (2001-2004)
 J. E. Whittaker (1998-2001)
 R. J. Aldridge (1995-1998)
 A. R. Lord (1992-1995)
 M. B. Hart (1989-1992)
 A. C. Higgins(1986-1989)
 B. M. Funnell(1984-1986)
 R. H. Bate (1982-1984)
 B. Owens (1980-1982)
 J. W. Murray (1978-1980)
 J. W. Neale (1976-1978)
 R. H. Cummings (1974-1976)
 P. C. Sylvester-Bradley (1972-1974)
 L. R. Moore (1970-1972)

Awards 
The Society offers a variety of awards and honours to the micropalaeontological community, including the Brady Medal, the Alan Higgins Award for Applied Micropaleontology, the Charles Downie Award, Honorary Memberships, Student Awards, Grants-in-Aid, TMS Educational Trust Awards.

The Brady Medal 
The Brady Medal is highest award of The Micropalaeontological Society. It is named in honour of George Stewardson Brady (1832–1921) and Henry Bowman Brady (1835–1891) in recognition of their outstanding pioneering studies in micropalaeontology and natural history. The medal was commissioned and was awarded for the first time in 2007. The recipients of the Brady Medal are:
 2020: Dr. Joyce Singano
 2019: Prof. Patrick De Deckker
 2018: Prof. Malcolm Hart
 2017: Prof. John R. Haynes
 2016: Prof. Ellen Thomas
 2015: Dr. Marty Buzas
 2014: Prof. David Siveter
 2013: Dr. Graham L. Williams
 2012: Prof. Richard J. Aldridge
 2011: Prof. John A. Barron
 2010: Prof. Christopher R. Barnes
 2009: Prof. Thomas M. Cronin
 2008: Prof. Katharina von Salis
 2007: Prof. John W. Murray

Grants-in-Aid 

Grants-in-Aid are awarded annually to help student members of the Society and early career researchers (i.e. within 10 years of obtaining their last degree) with fieldwork, conference attendance, or any other specific activity related to their research which has not been budgeted for. The applicant can claim up to £500 towards their research activity.

References

Scientific societies based in the United Kingdom
Scientific organizations established in 1970
Paleontological institutions and organizations
Professional associations based in the United Kingdom
Paleontology in the United Kingdom
1970 establishments in the United Kingdom
Scientific organisations based in the United Kingdom